Dyad is a downloadable game for PlayStation 3 and Microsoft Windows, with OS X and Linux versions planned for a later release.  It was developed and published by Canadian studio Right Square Bracket Left Square Bracket.

Gameplay 
Dyad is a "tunnel racing puzzle shooting" game that uses a number of new concepts to build upon a classic genre. The basic premise of the game revolves around momentum. By using the action button the player is able to pull themselves from one enemy to the next as they fly down the screen. This concept grows in complexity throughout its 26 levels from using combos to fill up a special meter, to being forced to rely on sound to differentiate icons on the screen.

Reception
Dyad won the Audio Design award at IndieCade 2012.

Review aggregator Metacritic gave the PlayStation 3 version of the game a score of 82/100 based on reviews from 33 critics, indicating "generally favorable reviews". 
Metacritic gave the PC version of the game a score of 80/100 based on reviews from 4 critics.

References

External links
 

2012 video games
Linux games
MacOS games
PlayStation 3 games
PlayStation Network games
Racing video games
Single-player video games
Video games developed in Canada
Windows games